Live and Raw 70/71 is a live album by British rock band Atomic Rooster. It consists of two short concerts, specially-staged at the BBC's Paris Theatre in 1970 and 1971.

The original BBC master tapes of these concerts are now lost, and the source was an old tape, belonging to John Du Cann, of a very poor quality off-air recording. Nonetheless, the album is important to Atomic Rooster fans, as there are very few surviving live recordings of the first two lineups of the band.

Track listing 

1970:
 "Friday the 13th" (Crane) 6:38
 "Gershatzer" (Crane) 8:16
 "Winter" (Crane) 6:34
 "Before Tomorrow" aka "Shabooloo" (Crane) 6:55
1971:
 "Sleeping for Years" (Du Cann) 6:16
 "VUG" (Crane) 3:50
 "Tomorrow Night" (Crane) 6:37
 "I Can't Take No More" (Du Cann) 12:07

Personnel 
Atomic Rooster
 Vincent Crane - Hammond organ
 John Du Cann - guitars, vocals
 Carl Palmer - drums, percussion (1970)
 Paul Hammond - drums, percussion (1971)

Atomic Rooster live albums
2000 live albums
Angel Air albums